Genyorchis macrantha is a species of plant in the family Orchidaceae. It is endemic to Cameroon.  Its natural habitat is subtropical or tropical dry forests.

Sources 

macrantha
Endemic orchids of Cameroon
Vulnerable flora of Africa
Taxonomy articles created by Polbot